Peter Stjärnvind (born 11 August 1973) is a Swedish drummer. His current position is the drummer of Krux and Swedish black metal band Pest, and guitarist and founder of Black Trip. Before that he also played in Loud Pipes, Merciless, Unanimated, Regurgitate, Entombed, Nifelheim, and Face Down. He also appeared in several side-projects, including Born of Fire and Murder Squad.

Discography

with Entombed 
 Same Difference
 Uprising
 Morning Star
 Inferno
 Unreal Estate (Live)

with Face Down 
 The Twisted Rule The Wicked

with Krux 
 Krux
 II

with Merciless 
 Unbound
 Merciless

with Murder Squad 
 Unsane, Insane and Mentally Deranged
 Ravenous, Murderous

with Nifelheim 
 Envoy of Lucifer

with Pest 
 The Crowning Horror

with Regurgitate 
 Effortless Regurgitation of Bright Red Blood

with Unanimated 
 In the Forest of the Dreaming Dead
 Ancient God of Evil
 In the Light of Darkness

with Watain 
 Sworn to the Dark – guest vocals on Stellarvore

References 

Swedish heavy metal drummers
Living people
1973 births
21st-century drummers
Murder Squad members
Entombed (band) members
Krux members